Kryoneri ( meaning "cold water", before 1927: Στούγκο - Stougko) is a mountain village and community in the municipal unit of Nevropoli Agrafon, Karditsa regional unit, Greece. In 2011 Kryoneri had a population of 415 for the village and 595 for the community, which includes the village Koutsodimos.  Kryoneri is situated in the mountains northwest of Lake Plastiras, at about 880 m elevation. It is 11 km south of Mouzaki and 21 km west of the city of Karditsa. Its residents are based in agriculture.

Population

History

The village was founded in the valley southeast of its present location. It was relocated to its present, safer location during the Ottoman rule of Greece. The new village was named Stougko. As a result of the 1525 treaty of Tamasi, the Agrafa area was de facto independent; the name "Agrafa" means "unwritten", the area was not recorded by the Ottomans.

External links
 Kryoneri on GTP Travel Pages
 Plastiras Lake

See also

List of settlements in the Karditsa regional unit

References

Populated places in Karditsa (regional unit)